The Burj al-Taqa, also known as the Dubai Energy Tower is a skyscraper that was to be built in Dubai in the United Arab Emirates. Like the World Trade Center (Manama), it was to incorporate power generation assets into its structure, including a  wind turbine on the roof and solar panels.

The project was not publicly cancelled following the global financial crisis, but it has been quietly mothballed.  No ground has been broken on the structure site and there are no plans to begin construction as of January 2012.

See also 
 World Trade Center (Manama)

References

Proposed skyscrapers in Dubai